The Neerukonda Massacre happened in Andhra Pradesh on July 15, 1987, in Neerukonda village, inside the Guntur district of India's Andhra Pradesh state. An angry mob composed of members of the Kamma caste began attacking Dalit Malas after some of them held a wedding ceremony inside the town's upper-class areas. The rioters killed five people, one a Yadav and the remaining four Malas. Among those people killed was a 60-year old Mala elder. Many Malas fled to nearby Mangalagiri.

The riots, along with the Karamchedu and Tsundur massacres, have been described as having helped shape the perception of the caste system in Indian society.

References

July 1987 crimes
Massacres in 1987
History of Andhra Pradesh (1947–2014)
Massacres in India
Caste-related violence in India
Crime in Andhra Pradesh
Guntur district
July 1987 events in Asia
1987 murders in India